The 1992 Citizen Cup was a women's tennis tournament played on outdoor clay courts at the Am Rothenbaum in Hamburg in Germany that was part of the Tier II category of the 1992 WTA Tour. It was the 15th edition of the tournament and was held from 27 April until 3 May 1992. First-seeded Steffi Graf won the singles title, her sixth consecutive at the event and earned $70,000 first-prize money.

Finals

Singles
 Steffi Graf defeated  Arantxa Sánchez Vicario 7–6(7–5), 6–2
 It was Graf's 2nd singles title of the year and the 63rd of her career.

Doubles
 Steffi Graf /  Rennae Stubbs defeated  Manon Bollegraf /  Arantxa Sánchez Vicario 4–6, 6–3, 6–4

References

External links
 ITF tournament edition details
 Tournament draws

Citizen Cup
WTA Hamburg
1992 in German women's sport
Citizen Cup
Citizen Cup
1992 in German tennis